United Hospitals is the historical collective name of the medical schools of London. They are all part of the University of London (UL) with the exception of Imperial College School of Medicine which left in 2007. The original United Hospitals referred to Guy's Hospital and St Thomas's Hospital and their relationship prior to 1769. Since then the name has been adopted by the London medical schools.

In addition to inter-collegiate UL competitions, which include all UL colleges, the United Hospitals are engaged in an active series of sporting, and even comedy events against each other, and also at times as a united team.

Members
The current United Hospitals are:

Medical Student Newspaper is also distributed to the five members, with the editorial team being made up of students from each school. For the purposes of sporting events, the Royal Veterinary College is included in the United Hospitals, as was – until the demise of both hospital and school in the early 1980s – the Royal Dental Hospital School of Dentistry. The five members also contribute to the Saving Londoners' Lives project, sending medical students to deliver emergency life support skills training in schools.

The original 13 United Hospitals of London were:

MedGroup

MedGroup is the collective body of Students' Union presidents and British Medical Association representatives from each of the five member medical schools.  Monthly meetings ensure common workings and sharing of best-practice within the student bodies.. The committee is formed of six positions alongside the presidents of each medical schools students' union;  chair, vice-chair, activities officer, education officer, welfare officer and communications officer. The chair is Christian Oldfield (ICSM) and the vice-chair is Ciaran O'Toole (ICSM).

Sports

Combined teams
United Hospitals RFC
United Hospitals Athletics Club
 United Hospitals Boat Club
 United Hospitals Cricket Club
 United Hospitals Football Club
 United Hospitals Hockey Club
 United Hospitals Lawn Tennis Club

Occasionally compete in National Association of Medics Sports

Competitions

References

External links 

 
University of London
Medical schools in London
United Hospitals sports clubs